The Centre d'Études Prospectives et d'Informations Internationales (CEPII) is the main French institute for research into international economics. It is part of the network coordinated by the Economic Policy Planning for the Prime Minister.

Founded in 1978, the CEPII has a core team of around 30 economists. The four main research areas are: factor markets and growth; the international financial and monetary system; EU economy; international trade models.

External links
 Website of CEPII 

1978 establishments in France
Think tanks established in 1978
Economic research institutes
Political and economic think tanks based in France